The following is a list of the 27 cantons of the Ille-et-Vilaine department, in France, following the French canton reorganisation which came into effect in March 2015:

 Bain-de-Bretagne
 Betton
 Bruz
 Châteaugiron
 Combourg
 Dol-de-Bretagne
 Fougères-1
 Fougères-2
 La Guerche-de-Bretagne
 Guichen
 Janzé
 Liffré
 Melesse
 Montauban-de-Bretagne
 Montfort-sur-Meu
 Redon
 Rennes-1
 Rennes-2
 Rennes-3
 Rennes-4
 Rennes-5
 Rennes-6
 Le Rheu
 Saint-Malo-1
 Saint-Malo-2
 Val-Couesnon
 Vitré

References